Forton may refer to:

Forton, Hampshire, Test Valley, England, near Andover
Forton, Gosport, a location in Hampshire, England
Forton, Lancashire, England
Forton, Somerset, England
Forton, Shropshire, a location in England
Forton, Staffordshire, England
Forton, Tasmania, Australia